Arnaldo Marsili (born 30 August 1947) is a Brazilian water polo player. He competed in the men's tournament at the 1968 Summer Olympics.

See also
 Brazil men's Olympic water polo team records and statistics
 List of men's Olympic water polo tournament goalkeepers

References

External links
 

1947 births
Living people
Brazilian male water polo players
Water polo goalkeepers
Olympic water polo players of Brazil
Water polo players at the 1968 Summer Olympics
Water polo players from Rio de Janeiro (city)
20th-century Brazilian people